Dichomeris lupata is a moth in the family Gelechiidae. It was described by Edward Meyrick in 1913. It is found in Assam, India.

The forewings are glossy dark violet fuscous with an oblique ochreous-whitish strigula on the costa at three-fourths and a faint line from this to the tornus. There is an ochreous-yellow streak along the termen from the apex to near the tornus, attenuated downwards, with three acute projecting teeth anteriorly. The hindwings are dark fuscous.

References

Moths described in 1913
lupata